CAN SLIM refers to the acronym developed by the American stock research and education company Investor's Business Daily (IBD). IBD claims CANSLIM represents the seven characteristics that top-performing stocks often share before making their biggest price gains. It was developed in the 1950s by Investor's Business Daily founder William O'Neil. The method was named the top-performing investment strategy from 1998-2009 by the American Association of Individual Investors. In 2015, an exchange-traded fund (ETF) was launched focusing on the companies listed on the IBD 50, a computer generated list published by Investors Business Daily that highlights stocks based on the CAN SLIM investment criteria.

Investing mechanism and process
CAN SLIM is a growth stock investing strategy formulated from a study of stock market winners dating back to 1953 in the book  How to Make Money in Stocks: A Winning System In Good Times or Bad. This strategy involves implementation of both technical analysis and fundamental analysis.

The objective of the strategy is to discover leading stocks before they make major price advances. These pre-advance periods are "buy points" for stocks as they emerge from price consolidation areas (or "bases"), most often in the form of a "cup-with-handle" chart pattern, of at least 7 weeks on weekly price charts.

The strategy is one that strongly encourages cutting all losses at no more than 7% or 8% below the buy point, with no exceptions, to minimize losses and to preserve gains. It is stated in the book, that buying stocks of solid companies should generally lessen chances of having to cut losses, since a strong company (good current quarterly earnings-per-share growth, annual growth rate, and other strong fundamentals) will usually shoot up—in bull markets—rather than descend. Some investors have criticized the strategy when they didn't use the stop-loss criterion; O'Neil has replied that you have to use the whole strategy and not just the parts you like.

O'Neil has stated that the CANSLIM strategy is not momentum investing, but that the system identifies companies with strong fundamentals—big sales and earnings increases which is a result of unique new products or services—and encourages buying their stock when they emerge from price consolidation periods (or "bases") and before they advance dramatically in price.

Acronym

The seven parts of the acronym are as follows:

 C stands for Current quarterly earnings. Per share, current earnings should be up at least 25% in the most recent financial quarter, compared to the same quarter the previous year. Additionally, if earnings are accelerating in recent quarters, this is a positive prognostic sign.
 A stands for Annual earnings growth, which should be up 25% or more over the last three years. Annual returns on equity should be 17% or more
 N stands for New product or service, which refers to the idea that a company should have continuing development and innovation. This is what allows the stock to emerge from a proper chart pattern and achieve a new price.  A notable example of this is Apple's iPhone.
 S stands for Supply and demand. A gauge of a stock's demand can be seen in the trading volume of the stock, particularly during price increases.
 L stands for Leader or laggard? O'Neil suggests buying "the leading stock in a leading industry." This somewhat qualitative measurement can be more objectively measured by the Relative Price Strength Rating of the stock, designed to measure the price performance of a  stock over the past 12 months in comparison to the rest of the market based on the S&P 500 (or the S&P/TSX Composite Index for Canadian stock listings) over a set period of time.
 I stands for Institutional sponsorship, which refers to the ownership of the stock by mutual funds, banks and other large institutions, particularly in recent quarters. A quantitative measure here is the Accumulation/Distribution Rating, which is a gauge of institutional activity in a particular stock.
 M stands for Market Direction, which is categorized into three - Market in Confirmed Uptrend, Market Uptrend Under Pressure, and Market in Correction. The S&P 500 and NASDAQ are studied to determine the market direction. During the time of investment, O'Neil prefers investing during times of definite uptrends of these indexes, as three out of four stocks tend to follow the general market direction.

See also
Value investing
New York Stock Exchange
Dow Jones Industrial Average
Stock market
Growth stock
Investment strategy

References

External links
CAN SLIM on Investopedia

Books Referencing CAN SLIM

Market Wizards, by Jack D. Schwager (Paperback - 1993)
The Hedge Fund Edge: Maximum Profit/Minimum Risk Global Trend Trading Strategies (Wiley Trading), by Mark Boucher (Hardcover - Oct 30, 1998)
International Encyclopedia of Technical Analysis, by Jae K. Shim, Anique Qureshi, Jeffrey Brauchler, and Joel G. Siegel (Hardcover - Feb 2000)
Technical Analysis from A to Z, 2nd Edition, by Steven B. Achelis (Hardcover - Oct 2, 2000)
The McGraw-Hill Investor's Desk Reference, by Ellie Williams (Hardcover - Oct 19, 2000)
Online Investing Bible (Bible (Wiley)), by Jill S. Gilbert, Thomas S. Gray, Claire Mencke, and Jill Gilbert Welytok (Paperback - Jan 2001)
Short Term Trading, Long-Term Profits: The Complete Guide to Short-Term Trading, by Jon Leizman (Hardcover - Feb 15, 2002)
Applying Elliott Wave Theory Profitably, by Steven W. Poser (Hardcover - Jul 18, 2003)
Understanding Stocks, by Michael Sincere (Paperback - Aug 19, 2003)
All About Retirement Funds : The Easy Way to Get Started by Ellie Williams Clinton (Paperback - Sep 17, 2003)
Dave Landry's 10 Best Swing Trading Patterns and Strategies by Dave Landry (Paperback - Nov 1, 2003)
The Vital Few vs. the Trivial Many : Invest with the Insiders, Not the Masses, by George Muzea (Paperback - Oct 29, 2004)
How to Make Money Selling Stocks Short by William J O'Neil and Gil Morales (Paperback Dec 24, 2004)
Trading Crowd, The (Cambridge Studies in Social and Cultural Anthropology), by Ellen Hertz (Paperback - Aug 31, 2005)
How Legendary Traders Made Millions by John Boik (Paperback - Mar 23, 2006)
Master Traders: Strategies for Superior Returns from Today's Top Traders (Wiley Trading), by Fari Hamzei and Steve Shobin (Hardcover - Oct 6, 2006)
Technical Analysis: The Complete Resource for Financial Market Technicians, by Charles D. Kirkpatrick and Julie R. Dahlquist (Hardcover - Aug 18, 2006)
Trade Your Way to Financial Freedom (2nd ed), by Van K. Tharp (Hardcover - 2007)
The How to Make Money in Stocks Complete Investing System: Your Ultimate Guide to Winning in Good Times and Bad by William J O'Neil (Paperback August 10, 2010)
Trade Like an O'Neil Disciple: How We Made 18,000% in the Stock Market by Gil Morales and Chris Kacher (August 23, 2010)
Stock market
Mnemonics
Finance theories
Acronyms